Rupse Falls is a waterfall in central Nepal. It is located in Dana VDC of Myagdi District in Dhawalagiri Zone of western Nepal. It is 300 meters (984 feet) tall. The Rupse falls is a popular tourist destination.

Geography
Rupse is located in Beni-Jomsom Highway route. It is approximately 110 km from Pokhara and approximately 40.8 km from Jomsom.

Waterfalls
The height of Rupse falls is more than 300 meters.

Geographical significance
Kali Gandaki Gorge, the deepest gorge in the world, and the Kali Gandaki river are situated near Rupse Falls.

Tourism

Annually 1,50,000 tourist visited this site.

See also
List of waterfalls of Nepal

References

Waterfalls of Nepal